Andalan (also Romanized as Andalān, Andelān, and ‘Endelān) is a village in Baraan-e Jonubi Rural District, in the Central District of Isfahan County, Isfahan Province, Iran. At the 2006 census, its population was 1,141, in 313 families.

References 

Populated places in Isfahan County